Mark Anthony Martin (born January 9, 1959) is an American former stock car racing driver. He has the second most wins all time in what is now the Xfinity Series with 49. He scored 40 Cup Series wins. He finished second in the NASCAR Cup Series standings five times, third in the NASCAR Cup Series standings four times, and has been described by ESPN as "The best driver to never win a championship." Martin, with five IROC Championships, has more than any other driver. Also, during the 2005 season, Martin took over the all-time record for IROC wins, with 13.

Early career
Martin was born in Batesville, Arkansas. He began his racing career as a young man on the dirt tracks of Arkansas. He moved on to asphalt racing and joined the ASA racing series. During his ASA career, Martin raced against Dick Trickle, Jim Sauter, Joe Shear, and Bobby Allison. He won 1977 ASA National Tour Rookie of the Year. Martin won twenty-two ASA races and four championships, in 1978, 1979, 1980, and 1986.

Early NASCAR career

1981–1982
Martin had a tumultuous beginning in NASCAR, driving for six different teams from 1981 to 1987. He made five starts in 1981 driving for a team owned by Bud Reeder, earning two pole positions at Nashville and Richmond and finishing third in his final race at Martinsville.

Martin competed full-time in 1982 with the team, competing for Rookie of the Year. The team struggled for consistency, posting just eight top tens compared to 12 DNFs in 30 starts, including a string of five DNFs in six races. Completing just 73.7 percent of the laps and leading only four laps all season led to Martin finishing 14th in the final standings and finishing second to Geoff Bodine for Rookie of the Year. Despite finishing strongly, with two top tens in the final two races, including a fifth-place finish at Riverside, Martin and Reeder parted ways after the season. He remains the only driver to run more than six races for a team owned or co-owned by Reeder. At the end of the season Martin sold off the team, having signed with Jim Stacy to race in 1983.

1983–1986
Martin started 1983 running for Jim Stacy. The two parted ways after just seven races, posting three top 11s while having four races finishing 24th or worse. Following a two race-stint driving for D. K. Ulrich and one for Emanuel Zervakis, he landed a ride with Morgan-McClure Motorsports for six races, becoming the organization's first driver. While with MMM, Martin posted four finishes inside the top 20, including a 10th at Talladega.

Unable to secure a ride for 1984, Martin went back to driving in the American Speed Association. Jimmy Fennig came aboard as crew chief in 1985 and the two would go on to win the ASA championship the next season, Martin's fourth series championship.

His success in his three-year stint in ASA landed Martin a part-time ride driving for Jerry Gunderman. In five starts, he posted two top 15 finishes and started on the outside pole at Atlanta.

1987
Martin's success from the previous three seasons landed him a full-time ride driving for Bruce Lawmaster in the Busch Series. The season started strong as he posted two wins, three poles, nine top tens, and was fourth in the standings after 15 races. After just one DNF in the first 15 races, Martin had seven DNFs in the final 12 races, including six due to mechanical failure and four blown engines. Despite finishing in the top ten in the other five races, the team's failure to finish towards the end dropped Martin from fourth to eight place in the final standings.

Though the late season collapse ended Martin's chance at winning the championship, the success he had in 1987 caught the eye of Jack Roush, who tapped Martin to drive for him in the Winston Cup Series for 1988. He finished 1987 with three wins, six poles, 13 top tens, and an eight place finish in the standings.

Roush Racing

1988–1991

Martin came aboard newly formed Roush Racing, with crew chief Steve Hmiel, for the first of 19 seasons in 1988 driving the No. 6 Ford Thunderbird. Martin showed both signs of struggle and potential in its inaugural NASCAR Winston Cup Series season, recording three top fives and ten top tens along with winning the pole at Dover. He finished a season-high second-place at Bristol early in the season. Consistency proved to be crucial in that ten DNFs prevented Martin from cracking the top ten in points the entire season. He finished his comeback season fifteenth in the standings. Martin also competed in the Busch Series on a limited basis for Bill Davis Racing from 1988 to 1991.

Martin's 1989 season began a lot like his 1988 season with a DNF in the Daytona 500. After his first 4 races he was 18th in the standings but went on to continue the season with 4 poles and finishing sixth or better in the next 7 starts. He spent much of the season bouncing around from second to fifth in the standings. With three races to go, he won his first Winston Cup race at Rockingham, beating eventual series champion Rusty Wallace by three seconds. It was the first win for Roush as an owner. An engine failure in the season finale at Atlanta relegated him to a third-place finish in the standings. Martin led the series with a 5.3 average starting position, posting six poles and twenty-six top ten starting positions in twenty-nine races. He also posted fourteen top fives, eighteen top tens, and cut down his DNF total from ten to four.

Martin entered the 1990 season as a favorite to winning the Winston Cup championship. He started the season with a 21st-place finish in the Daytona 500, his first finish in the big race in six attempts. His team was met with controversy following his second career win at Richmond. During post-race inspection it was determined he had raced with an illegal carburetor spacer.  Ironically, had the spacer been welded instead of bolted on, it would not have been considered illegal. The consensus among Mark's fellow competitors was that this was not a performance advantage, but also was not strictly within the "letter of the law" with regards to the NASCAR rulebook. As a result, Martin was penalized 46 championship points and crew chief Robin Pemberton was fined $40,000.

Following a DNF the next race, Martin finished no worse than fourteenth over the final twenty-six races. He gained the championship points lead one-third into the season and held onto it for sixteen races before dropping it to Dale Earnhardt with two races to go. Despite having three wins, sixteen top fives, twenty-three top tens, and three poles, Martin lost to Earnhardt by twenty-six points in the final standings. Had the 46-point penalty never occurred, he theoretically would have won the championship over Earnhardt by twenty points instead.

Martin's 1991 season was disappointing compared to the previous season, as he entered with expectations to win the series championship. Though he ran well, he never achieved the points lead through the course of the season and was winless entering the season finale in Atlanta, a race in which he won. He also came close to winning at Charlotte three races prior, leading 198 of the first 212 laps before engine failure ended his race. Along with his win at Atlanta, Martin finished the season with 14 Top 5s, 17 Top 10s, five poles, and a sixth-place finish in the standings.

1992–2004

Mark entered the 1992 season's final race, the Hooters 500 in Atlanta, as one of six drivers in contention to winning the championship; but an engine failure on lap 160 ended his championship hopes. He finished the season with wins at Martinsville and Charlotte, along with ten top fives, seventeen top tens, one pole, and a second consecutive sixth-place finish in the standings.

Martin began 1993 with a sixth-place finish in the 1993 Daytona 500, his first top twenty finish in the big race. In the second half of the season, he became the sixth driver in NASCAR's modern era to win four consecutive races, winning at Watkins Glen, Michigan, Bristol, and Darlington. Along with a win at Phoenix, Martin finished with five wins, twelve top fives, nineteen top tens, and five poles en route to a third-place finish in the standings, 376 points behind Dale Earnhardt, and 296 points behind points runner-up Rusty Wallace. It was his first top five in the standings since his near championship win three years earlier.

Despite having eight DNFs, Martin finished second to Dale Earnhardt in the 1994 standings, 444 points behind. He posted two wins, including winning from the pole at Watkins Glen for the second consecutive year and the season finale in Atlanta. Martin scored fifteen top fives and twenty top tens during the season, his most since 1990. Other than the season opener in Daytona, Martin was never outside the top five in the standings. Among the highlights of Martin's 1994 season was a spectacular and frightening crash at the spring Talladega race: on Lap 103, Todd Bodine, Greg Sacks and Jeff Gordon got together in the tri-oval, collecting an additional eight cars, including Martin. Martin's car lost its brakes, ran through the infield grass, smashed the inside wall, and plowed through a guardrail, a chain-link fence, and lastly another guardrail protecting the infield road course, coming to rest only feet from a spectator area.

In 1994 Martin raced in the Busch Series. That year he became known for a mistake he made at Bristol. Martin would lead the field to a white and caution flag to win. When coming back by, Martin went down pit road thinking it was over but he did not take the checkered flag. David Green took the win, and in victory circle Green would say "I feel bad for him. A tough way for me to win, but I will take it." Martin finished in 11th; afterwards he stated "I can't believe anybody else would be that stupid" and that the mistake was "the stupidest thing I've ever done".

Martin won four races in 1995, including his third consecutive win from the pole at Watkins Glen and at Talladega, his first restrictor plate win. He also finished with 13 top fives and 22 top tens. Though he had only one DNF, he had five finishes of 28th or worse, which earned him fourth place in the standings. Martin was one of three drivers, the others being Dale Earnhardt and Sterling Marlin, to be ranked in the top five for all 31 races; none of them won the championship. For the Busch Series in 1995, Martin won 3 races, including the controversial Detroit Gasket 200 where Dale Jarrett won before being disqualified, handing victory to Martin.

In 1996, Martin was winless for the first time in eight seasons. Other than his lack of wins, his season was very similar to 1995 with 14 top fives, 22 top tens, and four poles. He finished a season-high second four times, including at Michigan when he was passed by winner Dale Jarrett with eight laps to go. He finished the season fifth in the standings.

In 1997 Martin would rebound scoring four wins at Sonoma, Talladega, Michigan, and Dover and finished third in the final standings, 29 points behind champion Jeff Gordon and 15 points behind runner up Dale Jarrett.

In 1998 Martin had his best season as he scored 7 wins, 22 top fives, 26 top tens, and 3 poles with an average finish of 8.64. But once again, Martin would rank runner-up in the standings to Jeff Gordon by 364 points.

Although he scored just 2 wins in 1999 Martin scored 26 top tens for the second consecutive season and finished third in points.

in 2000 Mark won just once that season at the spring Martinsville race and finished 8th in points. His first outside the top five since 1992.

His struggles continued into 2001 as he went winless for the first time since 1996 and finished 12th in points.

In 2002 Martin would get a new crew chief in Ben Leslie as Fennig moved to second year driver Kurt Busch. The move would pay off for both sides as Martin would win one race that season at the Coca-Cola 600 and was a championship contender all season and even lead the standings at one point but a late season penalty at Rockingham arguably costed him the championship as he came home second again this time to Tony Stewart.

Martin struggled again in 2003 going winless and finishing 17th in points. Ben Leslie was re-assigned to the #21 Wood Brothers Racing car with two races remaining in 2003.  Subsequently, Pat Tryson was brought on as the new crew chief for the 6 team. With Tryson, Martin returned to victory lane in the 2004 spring Dover race and finished 4th in points.

"Salute to You" 2005-2006

Overall with Roush Racing, Martin won 35 career NASCAR Cup Series races and finished second in the Cup Series point standings four times (1990, 1994, 1998, and 2002). While racing for Roush in 1990, Martin came his closest to winning a championship. A 46-point penalty at Richmond, for using an illegal (but non-performance enhancing) carburetor spacer, caused him to lose to Dale Earnhardt by 26 points in the final standings. During this time, Martin also won five IROC titles (1994, 1996, 1997, 1998, and 2005) and 13 races, both records for that series.

Martin announced he would cut back from 'full-time' Cup Series racing after the 2005 season, dubbing the season the "Salute to You" tour as a thank you to his fans. Martin won the Nextel Challenge in a 'Retro 93' paint scheme, picked up his final win with Roush at Kansas and again made the Chase for the Cup with a ninth-place in the standings at the end of the year. In a tribute to Martin's career at Roush, the team ran four throwback retro schemes in 2005, that celebrated paint schemes from 1981, 1988–89, 1990–91, and 1993.

In June 2005, it was announced that Jamie McMurray would replace Martin in the No. 6 car in 2006.  However, after the departure of Kurt Busch in 2005, Roush was left without a driver for the No. 6 car in 2006.  Martin later agreed to come back and drive for the 2006 season. Ultimately, it was announced that McMurray would be released from his contract at Chip Ganassi Racing one year early and would take over for Busch, who was dismissed from the Roush organization prior to the end of the 2005 season. David Ragan was announced as Martin's replacement in the No. 6 for 2007.

In 2006, Martin competed in 14 of 25 races in the Truck Series. He won 6 times, including the opener at Daytona, and recorded 12 top-ten finishes.

Ginn Racing

2007

On October 6, 2006, it was announced that Martin would split time with current Busch Series driver Regan Smith in the Ginn Racing No. 01 Chevrolet in 2007. Roush Racing announced that due to team limits imposed by NASCAR, they could not field a team for Martin for all 20 races he wanted to race in 2007, forcing him to move on, at least in the Nextel Cup Series. However, Martin drove two races for Roush Fenway Racing in the Busch Series, and also drove in three races for Hendrick Motorsports, sharing the No. 5 with Kyle Busch.

Martin finished second in the 2007 Daytona 500, only 0.020 seconds behind Kevin Harvick in one of the most controversial finishes in the races' history. Martin led going into the final lap before Harvick stormed from seventh to win on the outside. There has been much controversy over whether or not the caution flag should have come out as a result of a large multi-car crash behind them, which could have affected the outcome of the race.  Normally, the caution flag is shown as soon as one or more cars make contact with the wall. Despite the controversy, Martin was graceful over his defeat, saying, "I didn't get the job done."

2007 was Martin's first season to start with three consecutive Top 5 finishes. Martin is the only part-time driver in NASCAR history to not win the opening race but still be leading the points standings. It was also the first time he has had three consecutive Top 5 finishes since 2002. Martin is also the oldest driver in the modern era to lead the Nextel Cup points for more than one week. Martin led the Nextel Cup points from the second race of the season, the Auto Club 500, through the fourth race of the season, the Kobalt Tools 500.  Martin did not compete in the Food City 500, becoming the first driver since Cale Yarborough to sit out a race as the points leader.

Dale Earnhardt, Inc.

2007

On July 25, 2007, Dale Earnhardt, Inc. announced it had acquired Ginn Racing, and Martin joined Dale Earnhardt Jr., Martin Truex Jr., and Paul Menard as a driver for DEI starting at the 2007 Allstate 400 at the Brickyard. He shared the No. 01 car with Aric Almirola for the rest of the season.

2008

On September 8, 2007, it was announced that Martin would share the No. 8 car with Aric Almirola in the 2008 Sprint Cup Series.

Martin made his 700th career start at the 2008 Auto Club 500. On March 1, 2008, Martin won the 2008 Sam's Town 300 driving the No. 5 Delphi Chevrolet for JR Motorsports. It was Martin's 48th career Nationwide Series victory and JR Motorsports' 1st win. Martin finished out 2008 with 11 top-10s in 21 starts.

During the weekend of the 2008 Toyota/Save Mart 350, ESPN reported that Martin was leaving Dale Earnhardt, Inc. following the 2008 season. It was announced that Aric Almirola who shared the No. 8 car with Martin would drive the car full-time in 2009.

Hendrick Motorsports

2009: Runner-up Points Finish

On July 4, 2008, Hendrick Motorsports owner Rick Hendrick and Martin announced that he would replace Casey Mears in the No. 5 car for the 2009 season, running a full-time schedule for the first time since 2006. Martin signed a two-year contract with Hendrick, with a full-time schedule for 2009 and 2010. Martin grabbed his first pole since 2001 at the Kobalt Tools 500 at Atlanta, and followed up with back-to-back poles in the following week at Bristol.

On April 18, 2009, Martin became the fourth driver to win a Cup race in NASCAR after turning 50, winning the 2009 Subway Fresh Fit 500 at Phoenix from the pole position. The other three were Bobby Allison, Morgan Shepherd (twice), and Harry Gant (8 times, last in 1992). His win snapped a 97-race winless streak going back to 2005. After the victory, he did a Polish Victory Lap as a tribute to his late friend Alan Kulwicki, at the place where Kulwicki did his first Polish Victory Lap. At Darlington, it was announced after the Richmond race that Martin would drive full-time again in 2010; Martin would go on to win the Southern 500.  It was his first multiple-win season since 1999. In the 2009 LifeLock 400, Martin won his third race of the season when Jimmie Johnson and Greg Biffle ran out of fuel in the last two laps while Martin had strategically conserved fuel and stayed back in third waiting for the leaders to run out.  Martin added a series-leading fourth win at the LifeLock.com 400 at Chicagoland in July, holding off a charging Jeff Gordon.  Because he and teammate Gordon also finished 1–2 at the LifeLock 400 at Michigan in June, LifeLock will pay a $1 million bonus to a family in Colorado. Despite his series-leading four wins, due to some early season troubles, including two engine failures, a blown tire, and getting caught up in multi-car wrecks at Talladega and Daytona, Martin had struggled to get into the top 12, moving up two spots to 11th place with the win at Chicagoland Speedway.  Martin also got his fifth pole of the 2009 season at Bristol Motor Speedway for the Sharpie 500.

After being on the Chase bubble for most of the season, Martin qualified for the 2009 Chase, as he was in sixth place in the standings following the Chevy Rock & Roll 400. Because he led the Chase drivers in wins, with four, the Chase reseeding process moved him up five places and made him the points leader.

On September 20, he won his 40th and final career victory in Cup competition by taking the Sylvania 300 at New Hampshire in the first race of the Chase. The win broke Martin's tie with Kyle Busch for the series wins lead and marked the third and final time in his career that he had won at least five times in a season (1993 and 1998). Martin extended his lead to 35 points over Jimmie Johnson and Denny Hamlin, who were tied for second in the standings.

At the end of the 2009 AMP Energy 500 at Talladega, Martin was involved in a frightening crash in the last laps when he turned after contact with Martin Truex Jr. and Juan Pablo Montoya, and flipped over one and a half times. It was the second time Martin had ever been upside down in his racing career. Once righted, Martin managed to drive his car back to pit road. The wreck essentially ended his championship hopes according to experts.

Entering the season finale at Homestead-Miami Speedway, Martin and Johnson were the only drivers still able to win the 2009 Sprint Cup championship. Martin finished 12th in the race, which was not enough to overcome Johnson's lead. Martin again finished second in the standings, for the fifth and final time in his career.

2010

In 2010, Martin started the year off strong and won the pole for the 52nd Daytona 500.

Martin ran well in the Bud Shootout, but was caught up in the "big one" during a green-white-checker finish and finished 21st. Martin started the Daytona 500 well, leading the majority of the first 30 laps, but after being stuck in the middle line of the racing pack, he dropped down as low as 33rd and had to pick his way through the rest of the day, eventually finishing 12th.

Martin ran well at California and Las Vegas, scoring back-to-back 4th-place finishes, and advancing as high as 3rd in the points standings, only 49 points out of the lead.  However, he was less successful in his next three races. He got caught up in wrecks at both Atlanta and Bristol, finishing 33rd and 35th, respectively. At Martinsville, Martin was leading the field and running top-5 during most of the day, until a flat tire relegated him to 21st.  During this stretch of bad luck, Martin fell from 3rd to 17th in the points standings, 214 points behind the leader.

The next three races of the 2010 season saw Martin rally back.  With a 4th-place finish at Phoenix, 6th-place finish at Texas, and a 5th-place finish at Talladega, Martin jumped from 17th in the points standings to 6th, 169 points behind the leader.

Martin's bad luck struck again in the following three races, as he struggled to get a handle on his race cars.  A 25th-place finish at Richmond, 16th-place finish at Darlington, and 15th-place finish at Dover caused Martin to fall to 11th in the points standings, 293 points behind the leader.

In the Sprint All-Star race, qualifying was rained out.  The field was set in the order the drivers drew.  Martin started 15th and finished the first 50-lap segment in 15th.  He used a two-tire pit stop to gain position and finished the second 20-lap segment in 3rd.  He held his position in the third 20-lap segment and finish third.  Martin lost a spot during the mandatory 4-tire pit stop before the start of the final 10-lap shootout for the $1 million.  However, as the field took the green, Martin was hit by another car and crashed, finishing 17th.

A week later, Martin returned to Charlotte Motor Speedway for the Coca-Cola 600.  Martin qualified 11th and struggled much of the race with handling issues.  However, during a caution with 20 laps to go, most of the field pitted, and Martin opted to stay out.  He restarted 2nd and finished the race in 4th.

Mark Martin had a season best finish of second at the 2010 TUMS Fast Relief 500. Martin crashed with 275 laps to go, but managed to work his way up 15 spots with bent fenders and no rear end.

2011
In 2011, he began the season with an accident in the Budweiser Shootout. During the following race, he was involved in a multiple-car accident. In the Subway Fresh Fit 500, he managed to finish in the 13th position. One week later, Martin participated in the Nationwide Series Sam's Town 300 at Las Vegas Motor Speedway, where he was able to win his 49th race in the series. He finished the Sprint Cup season 22nd in points. Martin parted ways with Hendrick Motorsports at the end of the 2011 season, with Kasey Kahne taking over the No. 5 Chevrolet.

Michael Waltrip Racing And Part-Time Days

2012

On November 4, 2011, Michael Waltrip Racing announced that Martin would replace David Reutimann in 2012, signing him to a two-year deal to drive the No. 55. He was signed to drive 25 races in both 2012 and 2013, sharing the car with Michael Waltrip and Brian Vickers. Martin finished the year with 4 top 5s and 10 top 10s. He led the most laps after winning the pole at the 2012 Pure Michigan 400, but was involved in a bizarre accident around lap 64. Martin was about to lap Bobby Labonte and Juan Pablo Montoya when Labonte's car got loose, collecting Martin and Kasey Kahne. Martin's car skidded down pit road and the car was penetrated on the opening in the pit wall right behind the driver's compartment, breaching the car's oil tank, and sending Kahne's pit crew scrambling for cover.

2013
Martin's 2013 season started with a third-place finish in the Daytona 500. He backed up his strong Daytona finish by winning the pole for the Subway Fresh Fit 500 at Phoenix International Raceway, becoming the second-oldest driver to win a pole in the NASCAR Sprint Cup Series.  He finished 21st at Phoenix, followed by a 14th-place finish at Las Vegas. Martin skipped Bristol, where Brian Vickers drove the car. When Martin returned at Fontana, he finished 37th after spinning on the back straightaway late race, collecting David Gilliland. Martin did not drive the no. 55 at the STP Gas Booster 500 because he drove for Joe Gibbs Racing's no. 11. Martin returned to the no. 55 at the NRA 500. Following two top 15 finishes in his original car in the next two races, Martin qualified 10th at Richmond, but finished 38th after an accident on lap 348. At the Coca-Cola 600, on lap 324, Martin was involved in a crash with Jeff Gordon and Aric Almirola, which brought out the red flag.

In early August, it was announced that Brian Vickers would drive the No. 55 full-time starting in 2014; thus, Martin's future status with MWR was left uncertain.

Joe Gibbs Racing

2013
A few days after the Auto Club 400 Joe Gibbs hired Martin to drive Denny Hamlin's No. 11 FedEx Toyota at Martinsville after Hamlin suffered a compression fracture of a vertebra in his lower back after being involved in a crash with Joey Logano on the last lap of the Fontana race. In his one appearance in the No. 11, Martin was involved in a melee on lap 180, taking damage, and later had a miscue on a pit stop that caused him to be penalized a lap, but he managed to finish 10th.

Stewart-Haas Racing

2013
After the 2013 Pure Michigan 400 at Michigan International Speedway, which Martin nearly won before running out of fuel with three laps remaining, it was announced that Martin would be given an early release from MWR, and would be joining Stewart-Haas Racing to drive the No. 14 Chevrolet beginning with the 2013 Irwin Tools Night Race at Bristol Motor Speedway, driving in all but one race for the remainder of the season as a substitute driver for the injured Tony Stewart; Austin Dillon would drive the No. 14 at Talladega Superspeedway.

2014
On November 8, 2013, Martin announced that he would not race in 2014, but was not yet ready to use the word "retirement". Martin worked with Stewart-Haas Racing in a consultant role (including testing).

Tony Stewart underwent multiple surgeries following the broken leg from the sprint car crash, and Martin remained in the No. 14 Chevrolet for all off-season testing activities. If Stewart had not been cleared by NASCAR to start the 2014 season, Martin was expected to race the No. 14 during such time, including the Sprint Unlimited. However, Stewart was able to recover in time to start the season.

Post-racing career
On July 31, 2014, Martin tweeted he had become a driver development coach with Roush Fenway Racing.

On February 6, 2015, Martin tweeted, in response to a fan's question, that he was no longer a driver coach at Roush.  Martin has now retired from racing himself but does work with a dirt racing team in the Lucas Oil Late Model Dirt Series, where his Mark Martin Automotive group co-sponsors driver Jared Landers.

Martin owns a family of automobile dealerships in Arkansas under the umbrella of Mark Martin Automotive, based in Batesville, Arkansas, with dealerships selling Ford, Kia, Chevrolet, GMC, and Buick vehicles.  He also owns Mark Martin Powersports in Batesville, Arkansas, selling boats, motorcycles, ATVs, and UTVs, by manufacturers like AlumaCraft, Mercury Outboards, Tohatsu, Excel, Honda, Kawasaki, and Yamaha.

Awards and honors
 1989 Richard Petty Driver of the Year 
 2002, 2005, 2009 NASCAR Illustrated Person of the Year Award recipient
 2008 Legends of The Glen inductee
 2015 Motorsports Hall of Fame of America inductee
 2017 NASCAR Hall of Fame inductee

Personal life
Martin resided in Jamestown, North Carolina, followed by a move to Daytona Beach, Florida, with his wife Arlene throughout his racing career.  He has five children (four of whom are from his wife's first marriage). His son Matt raced for a time in lower series but quit after 2008. Martin's father, stepmother and half-sister died in a plane crash on August 8, 1998 in Nevada near Great Basin National Park. He won at Bristol two weeks after the incident and fought back tears as he dedicated the win to his family. He also currently owns five car dealerships in Arkansas, representing the Hyundai Motor Group (Kia in Batesville), General Motors (Chevrolet in Melbourne and a Chevrolet, Buick, and GMC dealership in Ash Flat), Ford Motor Company (Batesville), and Fiat Automobili S.p.A. (Melbourne).

Martin was regarded as one of the first drivers in the US to adopt a personal fitness and nutrition regimen, which he credited for allowing him to race at a high level into his 50s. He was well known around the NASCAR paddock for sometimes lifting thousands of pounds every day except race days. During the 1990s he co-authored a book entitled Strength Training for Performance Driving, outlining workouts useful for adapting to the rigors of auto racing.

Martin and his wife, Arlene, currently reside in his hometown of Batesville, Arkansas and visits the local state park of Petit Jean Mountain frequently in Morrilton.

Mark spends most of his time now on the road touring the country in his RV. He is a fan of rap music, citing rapper Gucci Mane as his favorite; Martin recounts what got him into rap music was at a test at Charlotte where crew chief Ben Leslie was playing Dr. Dre in the transporter. He is an avid watcher of Anime, specifically Mobile Suit Gundam.

Motorsports career results

NASCAR
(key) (Bold – Pole position awarded by qualifying time. Italics – Pole position earned by points standings or practice time. * – Most laps led.)

Sprint Cup Series

Daytona 500

Nationwide Series

Camping World Truck Series

 Season still in progress
 Ineligible for series points

ARCA Permatex SuperCar Series

International Race of Champions
(key) (Bold – Pole position. * – Most laps led.)

Rolex Sports Car Series
(key) Bold – pole position

References

External links

 
 
 Mark Martin at NASCAR.com
 Mark Martin Automotive Group
 Mark Martin Powersports

 

Living people
1959 births
People from Batesville, Arkansas
Racing drivers from Arkansas
NASCAR drivers
International Race of Champions drivers
American Speed Association drivers
Rolex Sports Car Series drivers
ARCA Menards Series drivers
RFK Racing drivers
Dale Earnhardt Inc. drivers
Hendrick Motorsports drivers
Stewart-Haas Racing drivers
NASCAR Hall of Fame inductees
JR Motorsports drivers
Michael Waltrip Racing drivers
Joe Gibbs Racing drivers